Ah Pah Creek is a stream in the U.S. state of California.

"Ah Pah" is a name derived from the Yurok language.

References

Rivers of Humboldt County, California